Edward Brabazon, 7th Earl of Meath (c. 1691 – 24 November 1772) was an Anglo-Irish peer.

The second surviving son of Chambré Brabazon, 5th Earl of Meath and Juliana Chaworth, he sat for Dublin County from 1715, when his elder brother was called up to the Irish House of Lords, to 1758. In 1763, he succeeded his brother as Earl of Meath.

Around 1720, he married Martha (d. 24 April 1762), daughter of Rev. William Collins. Upon his death in 1772, he was succeeded by his eldest son Anthony. He and Martha had a younger son William who married Katherine Gifford of Aghern, County Cork.

References

1691 births
1772 deaths
Brabazon, Edward
Brabazon, Edward
Members of the Parliament of Ireland (pre-1801) for County Dublin constituencies
Edward
7